Sarah Miles (born 31 December 1941) is an English actress. She is known for her roles in films The Servant (1963), Blowup (1966), Ryan's Daughter (1970), The Man Who Loved Cat Dancing (1973), White Mischief (1987) and Hope and Glory (1987). For her performance in Ryan's Daughter, Miles received a nomination for the Academy Award for Best Actress.

Early life
Sarah Miles was born in Ingatestone, Essex, in south east England; her brother is film director, producer, and screenwriter Christopher Miles. Miles's parents were Clarice Vera Remnant and John Miles, of a family of engineers; her father's inability to secure a divorce from his first wife meant Miles and her siblings were illegitimate. Through her maternal grandfather Francis Remnant, Miles claims to be the great-granddaughter of Prince Francis of Teck (1870–1910), thus a second cousin once removed of Queen Elizabeth II. Unable to speak until the age of nine because of a stammer and dyslexia, she attended Roedean and three other schools but was expelled from all of them. Miles enrolled at the Royal Academy of Dramatic Art (RADA) at the age of 15.

Career

Early career
Shortly after finishing at RADA, Miles performed in an episode of the TV series Deadline Midnight titled "Manhunt". Her film debut was as Shirley Taylor, a "husky wide-eyed nymphet"  in Term of Trial (1962), which featured Laurence Olivier; she was nominated for the BAFTA Award for Best Newcomer.

Miles appeared in The Rehearsal (1963) for TV and then played Vera from Manchester in Joseph Losey's The Servant (1963), and "thrust sexual appetite into British films" according to David Thomson.

Miles was in a short directed by her brother, The Six-Sided Triangle (1963) and a feature film directed by and starring Laurence Harvey, The Ceremony (1963). She did Ring Round the Moon (1964) for TV.

16 June 1965 saw the release of Ken Annakin's Those Magnificent Men in Their Flying Machines, a British period comedy film revolving around the craze of early aviation circa 1910. A pompous newspaper magnate (Robert Morley) is convinced, by his daughter (Miles) and her fiancé (James Fox), to organize an air race from London to Paris. A large sum of money is offered to the winner, hence it attracts a variety of characters who participate. The film received positive reviews, described as funny, colourful and clever, capturing the early enthusiasm for aviation.

She was in Time Lost and Time Remembered (1966), directed by Desmond Davis.

In 1966, Miles gained another BAFTA nomination, this time as Best Actress. She had a "peripheral" part in Michelangelo Antonioni's Blowup. At Antonioni's death in 2007, she referred to him as "a rogue and a tyrant and a brilliant man".

Robert Bolt
After acting in several plays from 1966 to 1969, Miles was cast as Rosy in the leading title role of David Lean's Ryan's Daughter (1970). It was critically savaged, which discouraged Lean from making a film for some years, despite Miles's performance gaining her an Oscar nomination and an Oscar win for John Mills, and the film making a substantial profit. In Terence Pettigrew's biography of Trevor Howard, Miles describes the filming of Ryan's Daughter in Ireland in 1969. She recalls, "My main memory is of sitting on a hilltop in a caravan at six in the morning in the rain. There was no other actor or member of the crew around me. I would sit there getting mad, waiting for either the rain to stop or someone to arrive. Film-acting is so horrifically belittling."

Miles would marry the film's screenwriter, Robert Bolt. He wrote and directed Lady Caroline Lamb (1972) starring Miles in the title role. She then appeared in The Hireling (1973).

On 11 February 1973, while filming The Man Who Loved Cat Dancing, aspiring screenwriter David Whiting, briefly one of her lovers, was found dead in her motel room. She was acquitted of culpability in his death. Miles later commented: "It went on for six months. Murder? Suicide? Murder! Suicide! Murder! Suicide! And, gradually, the truth came out, which I'm not going to speak about, but it certainly wasn't me. I had actually saved the man from three suicide attempts, so why would I want to murder him? I really can't imagine." This led to the end of her first marriage to Bolt.

Television
Miles starred in some TV movies: Great Expectations (1974), Requiem for a Nun (1975), and Dynasty (1976) as well as the Spanish film Bride to Be (1975).

Her performance as Anne Osborne in The Sailor Who Fell from Grace with the Sea (1976) was nominated for a Golden Globe.

Miles appeared in The Big Sleep (1978), Venom (1981), Walter and June (1983), Ordeal by Innocence (1984), Steaming (1985), Harem (1986) and Queenie (1987).

She received great acclaim for Hope and Glory. Interviewer Lynn Barber wrote of Miles' appearances in Hope and Glory, White Mischief, and her two earliest films that she "has that Vanessa Redgrave quality of seeming to have one skin fewer than normal people, so that the emotion comes over unmuffled and bare."

Filming White Mischief on location in Kenya in 1987, Miles worked for the second and last time with Trevor Howard, who had a supporting role, but was by then seriously ill from alcoholism. The company wanted to fire him, but Miles was determined that Howard's distinguished film career would not end that way. In an interview with Terence Pettigrew for his biography of Howard, she describes how she gave an ultimatum to the executives, threatening to quit the production if they got rid of him. The gamble worked. Howard was kept on. It was his last major film; he died the following January.

Later career
She appeared in A Ghost in Monte Carlo (1990), The Touch (1992), Dandelion Dead (1994), Jurij (2001) and The Accidental Detective (2004).

She most recently (2008) appeared in Well at the Trafalgar Studios and the Apollo Theatre opposite Natalie Casey.

Personal life
Miles was married twice to the British playwright Robert Bolt, 1967–1975 and 1988–1995. He wrote and directed the film Lady Caroline Lamb, in which Miles played the eponymous heroine, and wrote Ryan's Daughter, as well. After his stroke, the couple reunited and Miles cared for him. "I would be dead without her", Bolt said in 1987, "When she's away, my life takes a nosedive. When she returns, my life soars." The couple had a son.

Miles stated, in 2007, that she had been drinking her own urine for 30 years for health reasons.

In 2016, she reported that she had written a sequel to Ryan's Daughter.

Filmography

Television

Books
Sarah Miles has written the following books:

Other work
In 1995, Miles was one of the readers of Edward Lear poems on a specially made spoken word audio CD bringing together a collection of Lear's nonsense songs.

References

External links

 
 Interview with Sarah Miles

1941 births
Living people
Alumni of RADA
English film actresses
English stage actresses
People educated at Roedean School, East Sussex
People from Ingatestone
20th-century English actresses
21st-century English actresses